High Point Historic District is a national historic district located at High Point, Moniteau County, Missouri.   The district encompasses seven contributing buildings in the central business district of High Point. It developed between about 1874 and 1954, and includes representative examples of commercial architecture. Contributing buildings include the  J. F. Tising & Sons Store (1874, 1892), East Tisinq Store Building / IOOF Meeting Hall (c. 1874), Post Office (c. 1874), McGill Cafe / Residence (c. 1941), and two frame and one brick privy.

It was listed on the National Register of Historic Places in 2005.

References

Historic districts on the National Register of Historic Places in Missouri
Buildings and structures in Moniteau County, Missouri
National Register of Historic Places in Moniteau County, Missouri